Black Star Beer is a double hopped golden lager made with two-row malting barley and a combination of Mittelfruh and Czech Saaz hops.  The Great Northern Brewing Company located in Whitefish, Montana is the original producer of Black Star Beer.

Beer
Black Star Double Hopped Golden Lager is an American "double hopped" (dry hopped) golden lager based on traditional European Pilsners. It is made with two-row malted barley. The beer contains 4.5% ABV (alcohol by volume), and has 13 to 15 IBUs (International Bittering Units). Brewed with two different hops, Black Star contains 20% Bavarian Mittelfruh and 80% Czech Saaz hops.

History
Minott Wessinger, 5th generation brewer and great-great-grandson of Henry Weinhard, started the McKenzie River Corporation, a beverage marketing company, in 1987. Wessinger grew up learning about beer from his father Fred Wessinger at the Blitz-Weinhard Brewery in Portland, Oregon.  In 1995, Minott Wessinger built the Great Northern Brewing Company in Whitefish, Montana and began brewing Black Star beer.

Other products introduced by the McKenzie River Corporation include:

 St. Ides Premium Malt Liquor
 Sparks
 Steel Reserve High Gravity Lager
 Howling Monkey Energizing Elixir
 Le Tourment Vert Absinthe Francaise

Great Northern Brewing
The Great Northern Brewing Company was designed by Joe Esherick and built in a traditional gravity flow arrangement.  The mostly automated brew house is one of the most complex for its size in the country.  The fermenting and packaging area, known as the Cellar is open and roomy, allowing for many brewery operations to occur simultaneously.

After 7 years of brewing Black Star, Wessinger decided to stop brewing in order to pursue other projects. Wessinger and Great Northern Brewing Company (GNBC) started production again in January 2010 and Black Star was officially reintroduced on February 6, 2010. Black Star is being brewed at the same facility in which it was originally brewed in 1995.

In addition to Black Star, the Great Northern Brewing Company produces other lagers, ales and seasonal brews.

Advertising campaigns
Black Star was introduced to a Pacific Northwest test market in the early nineties, which was supported by an acclaimed advertising campaign by Wieden & Kennedy.  The campaign depicted a make-believe history of Black Star Beer through a series of six commercials hosted by John Corbett.  The commercials were released in 1992 and received “Best of Show” honors in Advertising Age’s Best Awards competition.  Wieden & Kennedy’s Black Star campaign also won the Cannes Lions 1993 Film Bronze award.

In 1994, Hal Riney & Partners developed a Ken Burns style advertising campaign that chronicled the history of Black Star Beer from the building of the brewery in Whitefish, Montana to its projected future success. Hal Riney personally spearheaded the TV, print and radio campaign for Black Star Beer.  The campaign highlighted the natural beauty of Montana and the unique personalities of the Flathead Valley.

Awards
 Silver Medal, 1999 North American Beer Awards
 Gold Medal, Best of the West 1997, North American Beer Awards
 Bronze Medal, Excellence in Brewing 2000 North American Beer Awards
 Consumer Product Award 2000, Award of Excellence by the American Tasting Institute

References

External links
 blackstarbeer.com
 greatnorthernbrewing.com

Beer brewing companies based in Montana